Dame Lucy Stuart Sutherland  (21 June 1903 – 20 August 1980) was an Australian-born British historian and head of Lady Margaret Hall, Oxford.

Career
Sutherland was born in Geelong, Australia, but brought up in South Africa where she attended Roedean School in Johannesburg, then the University of the Witwatersrand, where she studied history under Professor William Macmillan. She graduated with first-class honours in 1924, then was elected as the Herbert Ainsworth research scholar for a year.

She then moved to read modern history at Somerville College, Oxford, where she again achieved first class honours. In 1926 she was the first woman undergraduate to speak at the Oxford Union, winning applause for her opposition to the motion 'That the women's colleges ... should be levelled to the ground'. After she graduated Somerville appointed her a tutor, and later elected her to a tutorial fellowship in Economic History and Politics (1928–45). She was principal of Lady Margaret Hall, Oxford, 1945–71. She was a pro-vice-chancellor of the University 1961–69, the first woman to hold that office.

In parallel with her academic work, Sutherland also became involved in government administration. In 1941 she was offered a principalship at the Board of Trade, and by 1945 had the rank of assistant secretary. After the war she chaired a Board of Trade working party on the lace industry (1946), and was on a committee of inquiry into the film industry (1949), a royal commission on taxation of profits and income (1951), a committee on grants for students (1958), and the University Grants Committee (1964–99). She was also involved with educational administration and was chair of the Girls' Public Day School Trust. She left an art collection to LMH on her death.

Publications
A London merchant, 1695-1774 : A study in economic history based on the papers of William Braund, 1933
The law merchant in England in the seventeenth and eighteenth centuries 
The use of business records in the study of history, 1935
The city of London and the Devonshire-Pitt administration : 1756-7, 1960
Fourteenth century studies by Maude Violet Clarke, ed. L. S. Sutherland & M. McKisack, 1967
Edmund Burke and the relations between Members of Parliament and their constituents : an examination of the eighteenth-century theory and practice in international relations, 1968

Honours
Commander of the Order of the British Empire (CBE), 1947 King's Birthday Honours
Honorary LittD, Cambridge University, 1963
Honorary LLD, Smith College, Northampton, Mass., 1964
Foreign Honorary Member, American Academy of Arts and Sciences, 1965
Honorary DLitt, Glasgow University, 1966
Honorary LittD, University of Kent, 1967
Honorary DLitt, Keele University, 1968
Dame Commander of the Order of the British Empire (DBE), 1969 New Year Honours
Honorary DLit, Belfast University, 1970
Honorary Fellow, Lady Margaret Hall, Oxford, 1971
Honorary DCL, Oxford University, 1972

References

Sources
SUTHERLAND, Dame Lucy Stuart, Who Was Who, A & C Black, 1920–2016 (online edition, Oxford University Press, 2014)

Obituary, The Times, London, 21 August 1980, page 12

External links

1903 births
1980 deaths
Alumni of Roedean School, South Africa
University of the Witwatersrand alumni
Alumni of Somerville College, Oxford
Fellows of Somerville College, Oxford
Principals of Lady Margaret Hall, Oxford
Dames Commander of the Order of the British Empire
Fellows of the British Academy
British women historians
20th-century British historians
Australian emigrants to England
Australian expatriates in England